The 2015 Kirklees Metropolitan Borough Council election took place on 7 May 2015 to elect members of Kirklees Metropolitan Borough Council in England. This was on the same day as other local elections.

Council make up
After the 2015 local election, the  political make up of the council was as follows:

References

2015 English local elections
May 2015 events in the United Kingdom
2015
2010s in West Yorkshire